Arthur 'Pius' Fahr (1898 – 9 May 1968) was a Swiss footballer who played for FC Basel.

'Pius' Fahr started his playing career as goalkeeper and in later years he played mainly in the position as forward. Between the years 1914 and 1927 he played a total of 208 games for Basel scoring a total of 18 goals. 112 of these games were in the Swiss Serie A and 96 were friendly games. He scored 6 goals in the domestic league, the other 12 were scored during the test games. He scored his first goal for Basel in the home game against Aarau on 19 March 1922. It was the winning goal in the 2–1 victory.

Sources and references

 Rotblau: Jahrbuch Saison 2017/2018. Publisher: FC Basel Marketing AG. 
 Die ersten 125 Jahre. Publisher: Josef Zindel im Friedrich Reinhardt Verlag, Basel. 
 Verein "Basler Fussballarchiv" Homepage

FC Basel players
Swiss men's footballers
Association football goalkeepers
Association football forwards
1898 births
1968 deaths